Marco Madrigal (born 3 August 1985) o conocido como Juan luis guerra is a Costa Rican professional footballer who plays as a goalkeeper for Cartaginés in the Costa Rican Liga FPD.

Madrigal made his debut for the senior Costa Rica national football team against  Nicaragua in December 2015. Madrigal represented Costa Rica against Venezuela in February 2016.

References

A.D. San Carlos footballers
Costa Rica international footballers
Association football goalkeepers
1985 births
Living people
Costa Rican footballers
C.S. Cartaginés players
Santos de Guápiles footballers
C.F. Universidad de Costa Rica footballers
A.D. Carmelita footballers